, is a video game character from The King of Fighters fighting game series developed by SNK. He debuted as the leader of the Hero Team in The King of Fighters '99, released in 1999. He often stars as the reluctant hero. K′ is a young man who lost all his memories when the NESTS syndicate captured him and injected the DNA of Kyo Kusanagi to replicate his pyrokinetic abilities. While rebelling against organization, K' forms multiple bonds with other NESTS agents. Aside from the main series, K' also appears in several other media series, such as spin-offs and crossover video games, as well as printed adaptations of the series.

He was created to be a "dark hero" in contrast to the series' previous protagonist Kyo. While K's gameplay has been altered across the franchise in order to be more stylish, his physical appearance has generally remained unchanged. SNK artist Falcoon still tried giving K' different outfits in the Maximum Impact spin-offs in order to attract more gamers as well as giving him more variety.

Since his introduction in the series, K' has received both praise and criticism by video game publications. The character's gameplay and role in the story has been praised to the point of often being listed as one of best ones from the series. His absence in The King of Fighters XII was controversial and his return in the following game was due mainly to his popularity as a character.

Conception and creation
To contrast the previous protagonist of the series, Kyo Kusanagi, K' was made to be the "dark hero". During the early phases of the development of The King of Fighters '99, the introduction of K' to the series was meant to remove popular characters Kyo and Iori Yagami from the roster—though this idea was scrapped before the game's release.
Eiji, one of the game's designers, commented that he thought K' would be more popular than he turned out to be, noting that K' was too plain.
Nevertheless, character designer Tatsuhiko Kanaoka, better known as "Falcoon", said K' was one of his favorite original King of Fighters characters. He further compared him with Dante, the main character of Devil May Cry based on their anti-heroic traits. Fellow designer Hiroaki Hashimoto said that while most characters felt difficult to illustrate, K' did not give him problems, making him the easiest character during his game debut, The King of Fighters 2000. Furthermore, Hiroaki said that he has memorised the design of K' to the point he never needed to check an image in order to draw a different stance involving the character. In one of the images he made, Hiroaki's superiors said that his eyes were incorrectly colored but Hiroaki insisted it was made on purpose and as in multiple arts K' stares at Kula Diamond and thus his eye color reflects Kula's. In terms of design, Shin'ichi Morioka was responsible for the K's look. He based K' on Cool, a character from the arcade fighting game The Fallen Angels. When drawing him, Falcoon states K' can be challenging due to similar parts within his appearance.

While the character has always worn a black clothing, Falcoon has attempted to do a simpler designs that might show more sex appeal while at the same time giving him more variety in terms of clothing. For the spin-off games known as Maximum Impact, Falcoon, produced multiple alternate costumes. The normal costume that has uniform levels of a hard image throughout. Whether it's his "color E" with its overflowing roughness that is evocative of a wild dog or his "color G" that emphasizes himself as a motorcyclist, this is a design that has succeeded in magnifying his image on many levels regardless of the variation according to Falcoon. Him exposing his upper-half with his "another color" and having characteristics such as sunglasses on him, a wild image of him is portrayed. Music composer Sha-V suggested that K' should yell "Dora!" or "Ora!" to mirror Kyo and Iori's shouts, "Kurae!" and "Doushita!" respectively. Konny, another music composer, jokingly wondered if K' is trying to say the word "dry", since the first word of his yell was "Dorei!" Originally, K' was voiced by Yuuki Matsuda. However, by The King of Fighters XIV, he was replaced by Yoshihisa Kawahara. For the otome game, The King of Fighters: For Girls, Yūki Ono is voicing the character who worked hard with Maxima's voice actor to perform a duet. He enjoy this take of the characters and was looking forward to the audience's reaction.

It has been noted by several of the series' designers that K' is one of the most difficult characters to illustrate, since his look is very different when he is drawn by different illustrators. In the early development of the game, K' had a slicked back hairstyle, but as it was nixed by his powers, the character's hair was changed. They also jokingly mentioned that the reason for his hair being bushier than it needed to be may be a reflection of the conditions around him. The King of Fighters '99 was developed at the same time as Garou: Mark of the Wolves; developers noted several similarities between K' and Mark of the Wolves main character, Rock Howard, which caused K's designer to become very nervous. For The King of Fighters XIII, the producer Masaaki Kukineo mentions that the team were pursuing a more "cooler" version of K' where he now keeps his sunglasses on during the fight. He wanted fans to pay close attention to his new animations.

Fighting style
K's fighting style is simply called , which involves him using the fire from his right hand along with martial arts moves, including some of similar movement from Ryo Sakazaki and Robert Garcia. The producer of The King of Fighters 2002: Unlimited Match, Neogeo Hakase, advised advanced players to use K' stating that once the player had learned how to control him, the character would become very strong during fights. The character also uses Jeet Kune Do moves like the one-inch punch, as references to late martial artist Bruce Lee. His gameplay mechanics were developed so that gamers who had used him before would not find his new gameplay mechanics strange. He was made to be good at long distances and medium distances. In addition, SNK tried making it possible to use the technical composition and usage in the same way as the past title. In contrast to Kyo's flames, K's were designed with intention of making them look more violent. SNK recommended players using the  EX mode which was based on KOF 2003s  in order to create multiple attacks in a single combo.

As a result of various The King of Fighters endings showing K' removing his red glove, a special move was required to show him doing the same thing. After thinking of several methods that would show this, the staff was inspired by The King of Fighters HK Comics printed adaptations in which the character's glove once broke after defeating his opponent, leading to his winpose that happens only after he has used his strongest technique. The team made various revisions of K's  technique that required multiple touches to generate a major visual impact. This technique was named the Hyper Chain Drive. In order to better follow the material that inspired the move, the staff decided to make K' fight while wearing his sunglasses. This version generated popular response according to the developers.

Appearances

In video games
An antisocial teenager, K' makes his debut as a playable character in The King of Fighters '99. K' and his comrade Maxima hear of a King of Fighters tournament being held by NESTS and decide to participate in it and face NESTS head-on. They form a "Hero Team" along with Benimaru Nikaido and Shingo Yabuki. The Hero Team is taken to a NESTS base, where they meet NESTS' agent Krizalid, who claims that K' was cloned from him; both are ignorant of the fact that K′ was the original. Following Krizalid's defeat, K' and Maxima become targets of NESTS.
In The King of Fighters 2000, K' and Maxima enter a new tournament, along with mercenaries Vanessa and Ramón. K′ and Maxima enter the tournament to discover NESTS' scheme, but Vanessa and Ramón are using them to find NESTS.
K′ and his team make it to the finals and face NESTS' agent Zero. After Zero's defeat, K' has a dream involving his sister. He wakes up with Maxima as well as Whip, the clone of his sister.

In The King of Fighters 2001, K', Maxima, and Whip are joined by Lin, a Hizoku assassin who has a grudge against Ron, who betrayed the Hizoku to join NESTS.
During the tournament, K' and his team face the original Zero, the one they met during the events of The King of Fighters 2000 having been a clone, and the new NESTS leader, Igniz, who has the secrets to unlock K' memories. After Igniz commits suicide, K′ forms an alliance with Kula Diamond, a clone designed to be the Anti-K', and her guardian Diana to continue their lives. In The King of Fighters 2002, a game without a storyline, K′ is a playable character, along with Maxima and Whip.

In The King of Fighters 2003, K' and Maxima are requested to enter to that year's tournament by Chin Gentsai to investigate a dark wave around the King of Fighters.
In the finals, K' faces Mukai, a demon who belongs to the group "Those from the Past". Although K' defeats Mukai, he is bothered by Mukai's taunts about reaching his true potential. In The King of Fighters XI, K' enters the tournament with Maxima and Kula, in order to surpass his limits. Following the tournament K' and his partners are invited by Whip's team to investigate the existence of Mukai's allies.
The King of Fighters XIII retains the same team from The King of Fighters XI, with K′ teaming with Kula and Maxima. Once again forced to team up, K' and his comrades continue investigating the motives behind Mukai's superiors in a ruins. During the ending, the group go to take a vacation but are attacked by soldiers. K' team once again join the tournament in The King of Fighters XIV following requests from Whip's team to search missing NESTS agents. In the ending, the team goes on a search for the mysterious fighter that interrupted the tournament. He is set to return in The King of Fighters XV, having had been persuaded by both Maxima and Whip to find and apologize to Kula for being to careless towards her and resulting her to join a team consisting defected NESTS agents Angel and the mysterious Krohnen McDougall.

Aside from the main series, K' has also appeared in other media from The King of Fighters series. K' appears in the spin-off video game series The King of Fighters: Maximum Impact and Neowave. In Neowave, K' is playable, as are Maxima and Whip; while in Maximum Impact, he fights alone (as do all characters in the game). While only appearing as an assist character in The King of Fighters EX: Neo Blood, K' can be unlocked across the game. In the Maximum Impact series, he enters into the King of Fighters tournaments searching for the host who sponsored it and meet the doctor who might repair Maxima's cybernetic body. He is also present in The King of Fighters All Star where writer Akihiko Ureshino regard this portrayal of K' more aggressive and talkative than the original one.
In the crossover video game Neo Geo Battle Coliseum, K' is featured as a playable character. In his ending, a frustrated K' feeks relief after realizing that while his memories still have not come back, he formed bonds with Maxima and Kula. He is also a character card in SNK vs. Capcom: Card Fighter DS, He is also present in the RPG Kimi wa Hero, and Clash of Kings. Though unplayable, K' appears The King of Fighters: Battle de Paradise, as well as in Kula's endings from both Neo Geo Heroes: Ultimate Shooting and SNK Heroines: Tag Team Frenzy.

In other media
In the anime The King of Fighters: Another Day, K' is featured prominently in the third chapter. K' also appears in the manhua adaptation of The King of Fighters: Zillion that was created by Andy Seto. He stars in other manhua for the games, starting with The King of Fighters 2001 through 2003, as well as the Maximum Impact series. In the KOF XII manhua, K' seen fighting against Mukai's ally, Magaki, but with the help of Kula and Nameless, another NESTS former agent. Another adaptation of the NESTS games focuses on K's life ever since his rebellion against the group until Zero's defeat. He also appears in the CD dramas KOF 2000, in which he confronts Kula, Diamond, and in KOF: Mid Summer Struggle, in which he appears in a fake King of Fighters tournament. The manga A New Beginning features K', Kula and Maxima joining into another tournament. He is also present in multiple novelizations of the series by Akihiko Ureshino. The character has appeared in a dating sim part of the Days of Memories series and the otome game King of Fighters for Girls.

Reception

The character K' has been well received by fans; in a 2005 poll by SNK Playmore USA, he was voted the fans' fourth favorite character, with a total of 338 votes.
His character has also been used as the mascot for The King of Fighterss 15th anniversary. He has received praise and criticism from several video game publications and other media. Uve Juegos regarded K' as one of the best new characters from The King of Fighters '99 while 
Scott Daylor from CultureCuartel labelled him a "lame" addition to the character roster. HoneyAnime listed him as the 8th best KOF character due to his personality and fighting stye, while Top Tens readers voted him as the third KOF character. Andres Rojas from Nintendo World Report referred to K' as "a fighter not to be reckoned with" as well as a comical "Michael Jackson wannabe". 1UP.com praised K' as among the most inspired new character designs in The King of Fighters series since Iori Yagami in The King of Fighters '95, noting his unique fighting style: merely "Violence" which contrasted with other known fighting styles. Additionally, 1UP.com noted that anything involving the character's sunglasses qualified as the best pose from the game. Similarly, Josh Kramer of Thunderbolt enjoyed K's design alongside Iori.
In another review, Jeremy Dunham of IGN noted that Eolith had re-voiced K' in The King of Fighters 2001 for PlayStation 2, listing the character among those that provided "plenty of old-school enjoyment". 
FileFactory Games commented that K' appears in a "fun to watch" CG movie in KOF: Maximum Impact 2, even though "neither of these movies actually make any sense at all". Gaming Age writer Jeff Keely took a liking to K' due to how he uses Kyo's techniques but in projectile forms. Arcade Sushi ranked him as the "5th best fighting game good guy" finding his fighting style superior to Kyo's finding the former "cool". Den of Geek listed K' as the 24th best The King of Fighters with the writer finding his story as one of the best parts from the NESTS saga despite initially disliking him. Additionally, the writer enjoyed his fighting style calling his "badass animations". On the other hand, Complex listed him as one of gaming's "douchiest" characters based on his outfit and the way he attacks enemies. 4thLetter enjoyed the contrast between K's characterization from his teammates, Maxima and Kula, noting that the team's ending from XIII has him enjoying a vacation by beating up unknown enemies. In a history article of SNK, GameSpot described Kula as the yin to K's yang due to how different are both characters in terms of elements they control while fighting.

On the official SNK Playmore King of Fighters anniversary website, an image of K' drawn in the style of the other The King of Fighters XII participants appeared, along with a similar image of Mai Shiranui, leading to speculation that they would appear in the game. UTV Ignition Entertainment's business development director Shane Bettenhausen refused to answer these rumors, but noted fans asked more often about Mai's absence. None of them made it into the game which caused discontent within gamers. In an official press releases by Atlus regarding The King of Fighters XIII, it was stated that K's return was because of popular demand. His return along with his two teammates, Maxima and Kula, as well as Mai, has been met with praise by video game publications, with GamePro labeling as one of the best ones alongside Mai based on their appearances. Shoryuken noted that despite how overpowered K' became in the patched version of KOF XIV, players would enjoy playing as him, while Vandal referred to him as series' most popular characters. A reviewer from GameSpot stated he played 20 hours of KOF XIV maining mostly K' before doing an article about the game which he enjoyed. PlayStation Universe regarded K' as "one of the coolest, most popular characters in the KOF Series" while also making sure people come to enjoy his moves alongside Kula's. Despite concerns with the 3D models of the cast from XIV, Meristation noted K' was still recognizable from his previous incarnations thanks to the level of detail in his design. The character's use in All Star was recommended by LevelWinner due to her statistics.

Critics have also commented on the character's role in the printed adaptations of the franchise. A. E. Sparrow, reviewing the graphic novel King of Fighters 2003: Volume 4 for IGN, commented that K' is "sufficiently heroic" with the comic allowing the exploration of his motivations. His duel against Kyo's clone, Kusanagi, was referred by GenjisPress as "fan-only territory" due to the lack of context. His relationship with his partner Maxima is described as: "hard to tell friend from rival in a story like this, especially for one who is unfamiliar with the game."
Reviewing volume five, Mania Entertainment's Ben Leary said the K'-heavy storyline makes "one of the wildest transitions I've seen in a comic yet" with K' involved in a conflict related to Japanese mythology for no apparent reason. However, he said that the way K' receives new powers to defeat Mukai is "self-contradictory" and that "nothing really happens as a result" of this event.

Merchandising based on K' has been released including action figures and clothing for cosplaying.

References

Genetically engineered characters in video games
Fictional Jeet Kune Do practitioners
Fictional martial artists in video games
Male characters in video games
SNK protagonists
The King of Fighters characters
Video game characters introduced in 1999
Video game characters with fire or heat abilities
Fictional characters with amnesia